Dr. Ekram Rasul (date unknown - 1948) was an Indian Freedom fighter as well as a doctor who spent most of his life in the service for humanity. He was the vice president of Indian National Congress of Odisha or better known as Utkal Pradesh Congress Committee and took part in the national freedom struggle, under the supervision of Mahatma Gandhi and Harekrushna Mahtab.

He was born in Daryapur, Sungra. Due to his achievements and work are undertaken on behalf of the community, a high school was built and named in his honour. The school is located in Rai Sungra, Cuttack, Odisha. Ekram Rasul has been an inspiration to many 
freedom fighters such as Baba Amte and K. Kamaraj.

References

1949 deaths
Indian independence activists
Indian National Congress politicians from Odisha
Medical doctors from Odisha